X-Factor was a professional wrestling stable in the World Wrestling Federation (WWF, now WWE) led by X-Pac that featured Justin Credible and Albert.

The faction met with some success, with X-Pac winning the WWF Light Heavyweight Championship twice, the WCW Cruiserweight Championship once and Albert winning the WWF Intercontinental Championship once.

History
The faction was formed on the February 12, 2001 episode of Raw is War when Justin Credible made his WWF debut, saving X-Pac from an attack by rival Chris Jericho. X-Pac and Credible formed a tag team, and soon afterward, Albert joined the faction as its enforcer.

X-Factor picked up one of their biggest wins as a team on the Sunday Night Heat right before WrestleMania X-Seven where X-Pac and Credible defeated Grand Master Sexay and Steve Blackman.

At Backlash, in April, X-Pac and Credible defeated the Dudley Boyz after Albert attacked D-Von. They also lost to the Hardy Boyz at Insurrextion in May 2001, and later that month at Judgment Day, they competed in a tag team turmoil match that was won by Chris Benoit and Chris Jericho. X-Pac lost to Jeff Hardy and Credible lost to Matt Hardy in singles matches for the Light Heavyweight Championship and the European Championship respectively at King of the Ring. The following night on Raw, however, X-Pac defeated Jeff Hardy to win the Light Heavyweight Championship. Three days later on SmackDown!, Albert defeated Kane in a No Disqualification match to win the Intercontinental Championship.

On the July 9 episode of Raw, The Alliance was established, and Credible joined it, representing ECW, while X-Pac and Albert stayed loyal to the WWF.  Despite representing the face WWF against the heel Alliance, X-Pac and Albert for the most part, wrestled as heels, competing against and feuding with fellow WWF wrestlers. Albert lost the Intercontinental title to Lance Storm on the July 23 episode of Raw. On the July 30 episode of Raw, X-Pac became the first person acknowledged by the WWF to hold the WCW Cruiserweight and the WWF Light Heavyweight Championships simultaneously by defeating Billy Kidman.   He lost the Light Heavyweight Championship to Tajiri on the August 6 episode of Raw, although he won it back less than two weeks later at the SummerSlam pay-per-view due to a distraction from Albert. With only two members left, the faction gradually faded when X-Pac suffered an injury in October 2001, while Albert went on to form a new tag team with Scotty 2 Hotty.

Championships and accomplishments
World Wrestling Federation
WWF Intercontinental Championship (1 time) – Albert
WCW Cruiserweight Championship (1 time) – X-Pac
WWF Light Heavyweight Championship (2 times) – X-Pac

References

External links
Online World of Wrestling profile

WWE teams and stables